Alejandro Barrera (born September 5, 1986) is a Mexican professional boxer. He previously held the WBC FECOMBOX light middleweight title.

Professional career
On June 19, 2010 Barrera beat Christian Solano by TKO in the ninth round and won the WBC FECOMBOX light middleweight title.

Professional boxing record

References

External links

Sportspeople from Monterrey
Light-middleweight boxers
1986 births
Living people
Boxers from Nuevo León
Mexican male boxers